The Asiatic-Pacific Theater was the theater of operations of U.S. forces during World War II in the Pacific War during 1941–1945. From mid-1942 until the end of the war in 1945,  two U.S. operational commands were in the Pacific. The Pacific Ocean Areas (POA), divided into the Central Pacific Area, the North Pacific Area and the South Pacific Area, were commanded by Fleet Admiral Chester W. Nimitz, Commander-in-Chief Pacific Ocean Areas. The South West Pacific Area (SWPA) was commanded by General of the Army Douglas MacArthur, Supreme Allied Commander South West Pacific Area. During 1945, the United States added the United States Strategic Air Forces in the Pacific, commanded by General Carl A. Spaatz.

Because of the complementary roles of the United States Army and the United States Navy in conducting war, the Pacific Theater had no single Allied or U.S. commander (comparable to General of the Army Dwight D. Eisenhower in the European Theater of Operations). No actual command existed; rather, the Asiatic-Pacific Theater was divided into SWPA, POA, and other forces and theaters, such as the China Burma India Theater.

Major campaigns and battles

Pacific Ocean Area

North Pacific Area
 Aleutian Islands Campaign, 1942–43
 Battle of the Komandorski Islands, March 1943

Central Pacific Area 
 Attack on Pearl Harbor, 7 December 1941
 Battle of Guam, 8–10 December 1941
 Battle of Wake Island, 8–23 December 1941
 Marshalls–Gilberts raids, 1 February 1942
 Doolittle Raid, 18 April 1942
 Battle of Midway, 4–7 June 1942
 Makin Island raid, 17–18 August 1942
 Gilbert and Marshall Islands campaign, November 1943 – February 1944
 Battle of Tarawa, 20–23 November 1943
 Battle of Makin, 20–23 November 1943
 Battle of Kwajalein, 31 January – 3 February 1944
 Raid on Truk, 17–18 February 1944
 Battle of Eniwetok, 17–23 February 1944
 Mariana and Palau Islands campaign, 1944
 Battle of Saipan, June 1944
 Battle of the Philippine Sea, June 1944
 Battle of Guam, July – August 1944
 Battle of Tinian, July – August 1944
 Battle of Peleliu, September – November 1944
 Battle of Angaur, September – October 1944
Battle of Leyte Gulf, October 1944
Battle of the Sibuyan Sea, October 1944
Battle off Cape Engaño, October 1944
 Volcano and Ryukyu Islands campaign, 1945
 Battle of Iwo Jima, February 1945
 Battle of Okinawa, April 1945

South Pacific Area
Guadalcanal Campaign, August 1942 – February 1943
 Battle of Savo Island, 9 August 1942
 Battle of the Eastern Solomons, 24–25 August 1942
 Battle of Cape Esperance, 11–12 October 1942
 Battle for Henderson Field, 23-26 October 1942
 Battle of the Santa Cruz Islands, 26 October 1942
 Naval Battle of Guadalcanal, 12–15 November 1942
 Battle of Tassafaronga, 30 November 1942
Solomon Islands Campaign, January 1942 – November 1943
New Georgia Campaign, June–August 1943
Battle of Kula Gulf, 6 July 1943
Battle of Kolombangara, 12–13 July 1943
Battle of Vella Gulf, 6–7 August 1943
Battle of Vella Lavella, August–October 1943
Naval Battle of Vella Lavella: 6/7 October 1943
Land Battle of Vella Lavella: 15 August – 9 October 1943
Bougainville campaign, November 1943 – August 1945
Landings at Cape Torokina (Operation Cherryblossom), 1–3 November 1943
Battle of Empress Augusta Bay, 1–2 November 1943
Bombing of Rabaul (1943), 2–11 November 1943
Battle of Koromokina Lagoon, 7–8 November 1943
Battle for Piva Trail, 8–9 November 1943
Battle of the Coconut Grove, 13–14 November 1943
Battle of Piva Forks, 18–25 November 1943
Battle of Cape St. George, 25 November 1943
Raid on Koiari, 28–29 November 1943
Battle of Hellzapoppin Ridge and Hill 600A, 12–24 December 1943
Pacification of Rabaul, 17 December 1943 – 8 August 1945
Battle of the Green Islands, 15–20 February 1944
Second Battle of Torokina, 8–25 March 1944
Battle of Pearl Ridge, 30–31 December 1944
Battle of Tsimba Ridge, 17 January – 9 February 1945
Battle of Slater's Knoll, 28 March – 6 April 1945
Battle of the Hongorai River, 17 April – 22 May 1945
Battle of Porton Plantation, 8–10 June 1945
Battle of Ratsua, June–August 1945

South West Pacific Area

 Philippines campaign, 1942
Battle of Bataan, 7 January – 9 April 1942
Battle of Corregidor, 5-6 May 1942
 Dutch East Indies campaign, 1941–42
Battle of Borneo (1941–42), 16 December 1941 – March 1942
Battle of Manado, 11–13 January 1942
Battle of Tarakan (1942), January 11–12, 1942
Battle of Balikpapan (1942), 23–24 January 1942
Battle of Ambon, 30 January – 3 February 1942
Battle of Palembang, 13–15 February 1942
Battle of Makassar Strait, 4 February 1942
Battle of Badung Strait, 19–20 February 1942
Battle of the Java Sea, 27 February 1942
Battle of Sunda Strait, 28 February – 1 March 1942
Second Battle of the Java Sea, 1 March 1942
Battle of Java (1942), 28 February – 12 March 1942
Battle of Timor, 19 February 1942 – 10 February 1943
 New Guinea campaign, 1942–45
Battle of Rabaul (1942), 23 January – 9 February 1942
Bombing of Rabaul (1942), February and March 1942
Invasion of Salamaua–Lae, 8-13 March 1942
Battle of the Coral Sea, 4-8 May 1942
Kokoda Track campaign, 21 July – 16 November 1942
Invasion of Buna-Gona, 21-27 July 1942
Battle of Kokoda, 28–29 July 1942 and 8–10 August 1942
Battle of Isurava, 26–31 August 1942
First Battle of Eora Creek, 31 August 1942 – 5 September 1942
Battle of Efogi, 6–9 September 1942
Battle of Ioribaiwa, 14–16 September 1942
Second Battle of Eora Creek, 11–28 October 1942
Battle of Oivi–Gorari, 4–11 November 1942
Battle of Milne Bay, 25 August – 7 September 1942
Battle of Goodenough Island, 22-27 October 1942
Battle of Buna–Gona, 16 November 1942 – 22 January 1943
Battle of Wau, 29 January - 4 February 1943
Battle of the Bismarck Sea, 2-4 March 1943
Landings at Woodlark and Kiriwina (Operation Chronicle), 30 June 1943 
Salamaua–Lae campaign, April–September 1943
Battle of Bobdubi, 22 April 1943 – 19 August 1943
Battle of Mubo, 22 April 1943 – 14 July 1943
Battle of Lababia Ridge, 20–23 June 1943
Landing at Nassau Bay, 30 June - 6 July 1943
Battle of Mount Tambu, 16 July 1943  – 18 August 1943
Landing at Lae (Operation Postern), 4–16 September 1943
Landing at Nadzab (Operation Postern), 5 September 1943
Huon Peninsula campaign, September 1943 – March 1944
Landing at Scarlet Beach (Operation Diminish), 22 September – 2 October 1943
Battle of Finschhafen, 22 September – 24 October 1943
Battle of Sattelberg, 17–25 November 1943
Battle of Wareo, 27 November – 8 December 1943
Battle of Sio, 5 December 1943 – 1 March 1944
Landing on Long Island, 26 December 1943
Landing at Saidor (Operation Michaelmas), 2 January 1944 – 10 February 1944
Finisterre Range campaign, September 1943 – April 1944
Battle of Kaiapit, 19–20 September 1943
Battle of Dumpu, 22 September – 4 October 1943
Battle of The Pimple, 27–28 December 1943
Battle of Shaggy Ridge, 19–31 January 1944
Battle of Madang, February – April 1944
Bougainville campaign, November 1943 – August 1945 (referred to as part of both the New Guinea and the Solomon Islands campaigns)
New Britain campaign, December 1943 – August 1945
Battle of Arawe, 15 December 1943 – 24 February 1944
Battle of Cape Gloucester, 26 December 1943 – 16 January 1944
Battle of Talasea, 6 – 9 March 1944
Landing at Jacquinot Bay, 4 November 1944
Battle of Wide Bay–Open Bay, December 1944 – April 1945
Admiralty Islands campaign, 29 February – 18 May 1944 
Landing on Emirau, 20 - 27 March 1944
Western New Guinea campaign, April 1944 – August 1945
Invasion of Hollandia and Aitape, 22 April 1944
Battle of Lone Tree Hill, 17 May – 2 September 1944
Battle of Wakde, 18–21 May 1944
Battle of Biak, 27 May 1944
Battle of Noemfoor, 2 July - August 31 1944
Battle of Driniumor River, 10 July – 25 August 1944
Battle of Sansapor, 30 July – 31 August 1944
Battle of Morotai 15 September 1944
Aitape–Wewak campaign, November 1944 – August 1945
 Philippines campaign, 1944-45
Battle of Leyte, October–December 1944
Battle of Leyte Gulf, October 1944
Battle of Palawan Passage, October 1944
Battle of Surigao Strait, October 1944
Battle off Samar, October 1944
Battle of Mindoro, December 1944
Battle of Lingayen Gulf, January 1945
Battle of Luzon, January–August 1945
Battle of Manila, February–March 1945
Battle of Corregidor, February 1945
Invasion of Palawan, February–April 1945
Battle of the Visayas, March–July 1945
Battle of Mindanao, March–August 1945
Battle of Maguindanao, January–September 1945
 Borneo campaign, 1945
Battle of Tarakan, May–June 1945
Battle of North Borneo, June–August 1945
Battle of Balikpapan, July 1945

China-Burma-India Theater

Burma, December 1942 – May 1942
India-Burma, April 1942 – January 1945
China Defensive, July 1942 – May 1945
Central Burma, January 1945 – July 1945
China Offensive, May1945 – September 1945

Notes

Footnotes

References

Further reading

 
 
 
 
 
 

sl:Vojna za Tihi ocean